Miss Venezuela 1997 was the 44th edition of Miss Venezuela pageant was held in Caracas, Venezuela on 12 September 1997. The pageant was won by Veruska Ramírez of Táchira, who was crowned by outgoing queen Marena Bencomo of Carabobo. 29 delegates competed for the crown.

Results

Special awards
 Miss Photogenic (voted by press reporters) - Christina Dieckmann (Miss Nueva Esparta)
 Miss Internet (voted by www.missvenezuela.com viewers) - Christina Dieckmann (Miss Nueva Esparta)
 Miss Congeniality (voted by Miss Venezuela contestants) - Annarella Bono (Miss Anzoátegui)
 Miss Figure - Daniela Kosán (Miss Aragua)
 Best Hair - Annarella Bono (Miss Anzoátegui)
 Best Smile - Maylen Noguera (Miss Cojedes)
 Most beautiful Eyes - Veruska Ramírez (Miss Táchira)
 Miss Elegance - Heidi García (Miss Carabobo)
 Best Legs - Maria Alejandra Márquez (Miss Miranda)

Delegates
The Miss Venezuela 1997 delegates are:

Notes
Veruska Ramírez placed as 1st runner-up in Miss Universe 1998 in Honolulu, Hawaii, United States.
Christina Dieckmann was unplaced at Miss World 1997, failing to reach the semi-finals (top 10).
Daniela Kosán won Nuestra Belleza Internacional 1997 in Miami, Florida, United States. She also placed as 1st runner up in Miss International 1998 in Tokyo, Japan.
Patricia Fuenmayor won Reina Sudamericana 1997 in Santa Cruz, Bolivia.
Jairam Navas won Reinado Internacional del Café 1998 in Manizales, Colombia.
Maylen Noguera placed as semifinalist in Miss América Latina 1998 in Costa del Sol, El Salvador.
Denisse Carrillo won Miss Blond International 1998 in Millstatt, Austria.
Claudia La Gatta was placed as 4th runner up in Miss Italia Nel Mondo 1998 in Salsomaggiore, Italy.
Andrea Garay was placed as semifinalist in Super Top Model of the World 1998 in Athens, Greece.

External links
Miss Venezuela official website

1997 beauty pageants
1997 in Venezuela